The 2017 Tilia Slovenia Open was a professional tennis tournament played on hard courts. It was the fifth edition of the tournament which was part of the 2017 ATP Challenger Tour. It took place in Portorož, Slovenia between 7 – 12 August 2017.

Singles main-draw entrants

Seeds

 1 Rankings are as of 31 July 2017.

Other entrants
The following players received wildcards into the singles main draw:
  Grega Boh
  Jaime Fermosell Delgado
  Tom Kočevar-Dešman
  Sven Lah

The following player received entry into the singles main draw as a special exempt:
  Gerard Granollers

The following player received entry into the singles main draw as an alternate:
  Matteo Viola

The following players received entry from the qualifying draw:
  Ljubomir Čelebić
  Evgeny Karlovskiy
  Albano Olivetti
  Franko Škugor

Champions

Singles

  Sergiy Stakhovsky def.  Matteo Berrettini 6–7(4–7), 7–6(8–6), 6–3.

Doubles

  Hans Podlipnik Castillo /  Andrei Vasilevski def.  Lukáš Rosol /  Franko Škugor 6–3, 7–6(7–4).

External links
Official Website

2017 ATP Challenger Tour
2017
2017 in Slovenian tennis